Nyal Aston Nathanial Bell (born 17 January 1997) is an English footballer who plays as a forward for Southport.

Playing career

Rochdale
A Rochdale youth graduate, Bell made his first team debut on 20 September 2014, coming on as a late substitute in a 1–0 home win against Coventry City. On 23 October he was included in LFE's XI for October, due to his good performances with the Academy.

Droylsden
Nyal spent 1 month on loan at semi-pro club Droylsden after an unsuccessful second season spell at Rochdale.

Chester (loan)
Bell joined Chester on loan for initially a month.

Gateshead
On 15 June 2016, Bell joined Gateshead following his release by Rochdale.

Altrincham
Bell joined Altrincham on a one-month loan on 19 August. He made his debut the following day in a 0–2 defeat to Gainsborough Trinity.

Stockport County
In June 2018, Bell joined hometown team, Stockport County from Gateshead. Bell was a regular member of the Stockport starting eleven in their championship winning 2018/19 season, scoring 9 goals in 35 league appearances. Despite a slow start to the season Bell's performances quickly improved, toward the end of the season he became manager Jim Gannon's first choice striker over teammate Frank Mulhern.

In September 2018, Bell scored a goal against Leamington and celebrated in the corner with a man dressed as a bride. The moment was captured the following week in a match program entitled 'Ding Dong Bell'

FC Halifax Town (loan)
On 23 November 2020, Bell joined Halifax Town on a short-term loan deal. On 4 January 2021, Bell was recalled by his parent club Stockport County after scoring three goals from seven league games for Halifax Town.

Altrincham (second spell on loan)
On 16 March 2021, Bell returned to Altrincham on loan for the remainder of the 2020-21 season.

Kidderminster Harriers
On 28 June 2021, Bell agreed to join National League North side Kidderminster Harriers following his release from Stockport. Following the conclusion of the 2021-22 season, he was released by the club.

Tamworth (loan)
On 24 December 2021, Bell signed on loan for Southern League Premier Central side Tamworth on a deal running until 6 February 2022.

Southport
On 2 July 2022, Bell signed for Southport.

Career statistics

References

External links

1997 births
Living people
English footballers
Association football forwards
Rochdale A.F.C. players
Droylsden F.C. players
Chester F.C. players
Gateshead F.C. players
Altrincham F.C. players
Stockport County F.C. players
Alfreton Town F.C. players
FC Halifax Town players
Kidderminster Harriers F.C. players
Curzon Ashton F.C. players
Tamworth F.C. players
English Football League players
National League (English football) players
Northern Premier League players
English people of Jamaican descent